is a passenger railway station located in Takatsu-ku, Kawasaki, Kanagawa Prefecture, Japan, operated by the East Japan Railway Company (JR East).

Lines
Tsudayama Station is served by the Nambu Line. The station is 13.9 km the southern terminus of the line at Kawasaki Station.

Station layout
The station consists of a single island platform serving two tracks, connected to the station building by a footbridge. The station is staffed.

Platforms

History 
The stop was raised in status to that of a full station on 9 April 1943. Along with nationalization of Nambu Railway, the station became Tsudayama Station of Japanese Government Railway Nambu Line on 1 April 1944, and part of the  Japan National Railways (JNR) from 1949. All freight services were discontinued from 5 March 1972. Along with privatization and division of JNR, JR East started operating the station on 1 April 1987.

Passenger statistics
In fiscal 2019, the station was used by an average of 3,820 passengers daily (boarding passengers only).

The passenger figures (boarding passengers only) for previous years are as shown below.

Surrounding area
 Kawasaki Municipal Midorigaoka Cemetery
 Kawasaki City Shimosakunobe Elementary School

See also
 List of railway stations in Japan

References

External links

  

Railway stations in Kanagawa Prefecture
Railway stations in Japan opened in 1943
Railway stations in Kawasaki, Kanagawa